FC Tulsa is an American professional soccer team based in Tulsa, Oklahoma which competes in the USL Championship, the second tier of the American soccer pyramid.

History
The club was founded as Tulsa Roughnecks FC by Jeff and Dale Hubbard, brothers and co-owners of the Tulsa Drillers minor league baseball franchise. The Hubbards were announced as co-owners and co-chairs on December 18, 2013. Prodigal, LLC., owner of Oklahoma City Energy FC, another USL club, served as a minority owner.

On February 26, 2014, it was announced that the team would be known as Tulsa Roughnecks FC, paying homage to the original Roughnecks which played in the original North American Soccer League from 1978 until the league folded in 1984 (and were best known for winning Soccer Bowl '83). The name received nearly 50% of the votes in a "name the team" contest held in February 2014.

The team logo, colors and uniforms were introduced on September 2, 2014. The oil derrick in the logo, as well as the name of the team, is a reference to Tulsa's "Oil Capitol" heritage; the dictionary definition of a "roughneck" is a worker in an oil-well drilling crew.
The team colors are Orange and Navy Blue with all kits supplied by Adidas.

On August 20, 2019, it was announced that the Craft family, composed of Tulsa natives and brothers JW, Ryan, and Kyle Craft, had acquired the club from the Drillers and Prodigal Soccer.

On December 4, 2019, the club announced that it would be renamed as FC Tulsa beginning with the 2020 season. The team's new logo was designed by Matthew Wolff.

Stadium

The team plays at ONEOK Field, a 7,833 seat stadium in the Greenwood District of Downtown Tulsa. The field opened in 2010 and was made the FC Tulsa's home in 2015. In order to transform the field from a baseball field to a soccer pitch, real sod is laid down atop the entire infield and the pitch stretches the length of the stadium, with one goal on the East side of the pitch and the other on the West side.

Club culture
FC Tulsa's main rivals are Oklahoma City Energy FC in the Black Gold Derby, with both teams being located in Oklahoma. The supporters group of both teams established a trophy, a four-foot wrench painted with the colors of each team on either side, which is awarded to the regular season winner of the derby.  83UNITED are the only supporters group recognized by the club.

Sponsorship

Players and staff

Current roster

Staff

 Sam Doerr – president
 Blair Gavin – head coach
 Richie Ryan – first assistant coach
 Matt Watson – second assistant coach
 Donovan Ricketts – goalkeeping coach
 Johnathon Millwee – head athletic trainer

Year-by-year

1. Avg. attendance include statistics from league matches only.
2. Top goalscorer(s) includes all goals scored in league, league playoffs, U.S. Open Cup, CONCACAF Champions League, FIFA Club World Cup, and other competitive continental matches.

Head coaches
As of August 30, 2022

 Includes USL regular season, USL playoffs, and U.S. Open Cup

Affiliations 
During the 2017 and 2018 seasons, Tulsa Roughnecks had an MLS affiliation with the Chicago Fire. The Roughnecks' head coach at the time, David Vaudreuil, had made 26 appearances for Chicago during the 2001-2002 MLS season. The Roughnecks' affiliation with the Chicago Fire was dissolved as of January 2019.

On February 11, 2020, Tulsa formed a partnership with EFL Championship side Wigan Athletic after tweeting about a possible friendship with a Championship side, to which Wigan responded.

References

External links
Official website

 
Association football clubs established in 2013
Soccer clubs in Oklahoma
USL Championship teams
2013 establishments in Oklahoma
Sports in Tulsa, Oklahoma